Richard Cust (1728 – 16 October 1783) was an English clergyman who served as Chaplain to the Speaker of the House of Commons, Dean of Rochester and Dean of Lincoln.

Life
Cust was the son of Sir Richard Cust, 2nd Baronet and his wife Anne Brownlow, daughter of Sir William Brownlow, 4th Baronet . He was educated at Merton College, Oxford, matriculating in 1745 aged 17, graduating B.A. 1749, M.A. 1752, B.D. & D.D. 1763.

Cust was Speaker's Chaplain to his brother, Speaker Sir John Cust . He was appointed a Canon of Christ Church, Oxford in October 1765, and rector of Belton, Lincolnshire in 1770. He also served as Dean of Rochester 1779–1782 and Dean of Lincoln 1782–1783.

Cust died on 16 October 1783 at The Old Deanery, Lincoln.

Family
In 1767, Cust married Mary Harris, daughter of Rev. George Harris. He died without issue.

References

1728 births
1783 deaths
Alumni of Merton College, Oxford
Chaplains of the House of Commons (UK)
Deans of Rochester
Deans of Lincoln